"Danny Boy" is an Irish ballad, the lyrics of which were written by English songwriter Frederic Weatherly in 1910, and set to the traditional Irish melody of  "Londonderry Air" in 1913.

History

In 1910, in Bath, Somerset, the English lawyer and lyricist Frederic Weatherly initially wrote the words to "Danny Boy" to a tune other than "Londonderry Air". An alternative story is that Margaret Weatherly sent him a copy of "Londonderry Air" in 1913, Weatherly modified the lyrics of "Danny Boy" to fit its rhyme and meter. Another alternative version of the story has Jess singing the air to Weatherly in 1912 with different lyrics. Another alternative story is that Frederic did not set the poem to any tune, but that his sister-in-law Margaret Enright Weatherly, who together with her husband Edward were living near Ouray, Colorado at the Neosho mine, set the poem in 1913 to the tune of the "Londonderry Air" which she had heard as a child in California played by her father and other Irish railroad workers.

Weatherly gave the song to the vocalist Elsie Griffin, who made it one of the most popular songs of the new century. Ernestine Schumann-Heink produced the first recording of "Danny Boy" in 1915.

Jane Ross of Limavady is credited with collecting the melody of "Londonderry Air" in the mid-19th century from a musician she encountered.

Lyrics 
The 1913 lyrics by Frederick E. Weatherly:

Meaning
There are various conjectures about the meaning of "Danny Boy". Some interpret the song to be a message from a parent to a son going off to war or participating in the Irish uprising (as suggested by the reference to "pipes calling glen to glen") or emigrating as part of the Irish diaspora.

The 1918 version of the sheet music with Weatherly's printed signature included alternative lyrics ("Eily Dear"), with the instructions that "when sung by a man, the words in italic should be used; the song then becomes "Eily Dear", so that "Danny Boy" is only to be sung by a lady". Nonetheless, it is unclear whether this was Weatherly's intent.

Usage
 Percy Grainger's Irish Tune from County Londonderry adapts the Danny Boy/Londonderry Air melody for wind ensemble in 1918.
 The song is popular for funerals; but the National Catholic Reporter wrote in 2001 that it "cannot be played during Mass."

Select recordings
"Danny Boy" has been recorded multiple times by a variety of performers. Several versions are listed below in chronological order.
1928 Colin O'More
1940 Judy Garland  Little Nellie Kelly soundtrack. Garland also sang it live at her concerts in Ireland and Scotland and most famously at her New York Palace Theatre debut in 1951.
1940  Glenn Miller and His Orchestra released a single that climbed to #17 in "Pop Memories 1890-1954" (not Billboard charts); Arranged by Glenn Miller and pianist Chummy MacGregor.
1941 Bing Crosby  Merry Christmas. "Danny Boy" was paired with "I'll Be Home for Christmas" on its original single. Recorded July 5, 1941. 
1941 Deanna Durbin in the film It Started with Eve
1950 Al Hibbler released a single that rose to #9 on the R&B chart
1957 Harry Belafonte sang the song from the album "An Evening with Harry Belafonte", where he began the song with a spoken recitative, before singing the 2 verses. He repeated the second half of the first verse the second time around. The Recitative goes: "The Time, a time of strife. The Place, the place is Ireland. And as Irish legend had it, as the last rose of Summer fell, and all the young men of Ireland were to gather to strike a blow For Ireland's Freedom and Ireland's Liberty, There were songs for those who stayed at home, and songs for those who went away, and all of Ireland was sad".
1958 Paul Robeson published a version.
1959 Conway Twitty's version charted at #10 on the Billboard Hot 100, #18 on Top R&B. (banned by the BBC)
1961 Andy Williams used the song's title for his album Danny Boy and Other Songs I Love to Sing. The single hit #15 on the U.S. adult contemporary and #64 on the Hot 100 charts.
1964 Patti LaBelle and the Bluebelles released a single that peaked at #76 on the Hot 100.
1965  Jackie Wilson's version rose to #94 on the Hot 100 and #25 on the R&B charts.
1967 Ray Price's single hit #60 on the Hot 100 and #9 on the Country charts.
1976 Elvis Presley on his album From Elvis Presley Boulevard, Memphis, Tennessee
1990 The song was used in the film Miller's Crossing sang by Irish singer Frank Patterson.
1992  Eric Clapton recorded an instrumental version released as a bonus track for Change the World 
1992 John McDermott released the song as an independent single.
1993 Shining Time Station used the song, performed by Rory Dodd, in the episode "Mr. Conductor's Evil Twin"
1998 Charlotte Church released the album Voice of an Angel by Sony Classical Records.
1998 Sinéad O'Connor sang the song over Davy Spillane's uilleann pipes on Spillane's album The Sea of Dreams. Actor-filmmaker Gabriel Byrne said this version is his favourite.
1999 Diana Krall sang the song on The Chieftains' album Tears of Stone
2002 Eva Cassidy included her acoustic version on the album Imagine.
2002 Johnny Cash recorded the song on his album American IV: The Man Comes Around, working with producer Rick Rubin in what would come to be the last album released during his lifetime. Cash had previously recorded the song for his 1965 album Orange Blossom Special.
2007 Hayley Westenra recorded the song as a track for her album entitled Treasure.
2014 The song appears in a scene of episode 2.6 of British period drama Mr Selfridge performed by Alfie Boe.

References

External links

 The Legend and History of the Song Danny Boy
 Danny Boy 1913 sheet music from Duke University Libraries
 Libera (choir):
Danny Boy (solo: Isaac London; concert in Armagh Cathedral); Libera Official, 2014 (Youtube).
Danny Boy a cappella (solo: Isaac London; concert in Guildford Cathedral, 16/05/2015); Libera Official, 2015 (Youtube).

1913 songs
Songs written by Frederic Weatherly
Labelle songs
Slim Whitman songs
Irish folk songs
Folk ballads